Recess may refer to:

 Recess (break), a break period
 Alcove (architecture), part of a room
 A setback (architecture) especially across all storeys (a recessed bay or series of such bays)
 Recess, County Galway, Ireland; a village

Music
 Recess (album), the 2014 debut album by Skrillex
 Recess (bbno$ album), 2019
 Recess Records, a record label
 "Recess" (song), by Skrillex and Kill the Noise
 "Recess", a song by Melanie Martinez on the album K-12
 "Recess", a song by Muse on the album Hullabaloo Soundtrack

Other uses
 Recess (Holy Roman Empire), the official record of decisions of an Imperial Diet
 Epitympanic recess, part of the middle ear
 Recess (TV series), an animated series by Disney
 Recess: School's Out, a 2001 film based on the series

See also

 Recessed light
 Recession
 Recessive
 
 
 Recces
 Reeses
 Rhesus (disambiguation)